Julian Stewart Lindsay is a musical composer, currently residing in the United Kingdom and working as composer-in-residence at Hampton Court House School. He was trained at the Royal Academy of Music in London. Lindsay has worked with artists such as Culture Club, Jermaine Stewart, Stevie Wonder, and The Beach Boys.  Lindsay collaborated as a songwriter  with Carl Wilson on "Maybe I Don't Know" from The Beach Boys.

Lindsay wrote the string and horn arrangement on Lyin' In Bed by Ziggy Marley and the Melody Makers mixing reggae with symphonic music. He also played keyboards for some of the Culture Club sessions; notably piano on "Victims" on Colour by Numbers. Lindsay also co-wrote on the majority of the debut album of Jermaine Stewart's The Word Is Out. Lindsay has written the music for television films and documentaries, including arranging the music for the television series Jonathan Creek.

In 1999 he was commissioned by the Durham Cathedral Chorister School to write a new work for the millennium to be performed in Durham Cathedral. The result was Vox Dei, a spiritual work inspired by the notion of godliness/spirituality being in everything and everyone. It was performed with a choir of some 200 singers. The organist was Daniel Hyde, who subsequently became an organ scholar at King's College Cambridge. The soloist who sang the title rôle in Vox Dei at its première was Gena West.

Lindsay composed the music for Fox Wars which broadcast on 22 October 2013.

References

External links
Bonn Musik

Alumni of the Royal Academy of Music
Living people
Year of birth missing (living people)
British composers